There are about 190 known moth species of Niger. The moths (mostly nocturnal) and butterflies (mostly diurnal) together make up the taxonomic order Lepidoptera.

This is a list of moth species which have been recorded in Niger.

Arctiidae
Alpenus affiniola (Strand, 1919)
Balacra daphaena (Hampson, 1898)
Cyana trigutta (Walker, 1854)
Euchromia lethe (Fabricius, 1775)
Meganaclia sippia (Plötz, 1880)
Micralarctia punctulatum (Wallengren, 1860)
Phryganopsis asperatella (Walker, 1864)
Phryganopsis cinerella (Wallengren, 1860)
Siccia conformis Hampson, 1914
Spilosoma aurantiaca (Holland, 1893)

Cossidae
Azygophleps psyche Le Cerf, 1919
Hypopta reibelii Oberthür, 1876
Paropta buchanani Rothschild, 1921

Crambidae
Achyra coelatalis (Walker, 1859)
Achyra nudalis (Hübner, 1796)
Adelpherupa flavescens Hampson, 1919
Chilo costifusalis (Hampson, 1919)
Cybalomia azzalana Rothschild, 1921
Cybalomia ledereri Rothschild, 1921
Euchromius hampsoni (Rothschild, 1921)
Euchromius ocellea (Haworth, 1811)
Euchromius vinculellus (Zeller, 1847)
Loxostege damergouensis Rothschild, 1921
Metasia angustipennis Rothschild, 1921
Metasia parallelalis Rothschild, 1921
Nomophila noctuella ([Denis & Schiffermüller], 1775)
Pleuroptya balteata (Fabricius, 1798)
Prionapteryx albostigmata (Rothschild, 1921)
Psara bipunctalis (Fabricius, 1794)
Sceliodes laisalis (Walker, 1859)
Spoladea recurvalis (Fabricius, 1775)
Tegostoma comparalis (Hübner, 1796)
Tegostoma pseudonoctua (Rothschild, 1921)
Thyridiphora furia (Swinhoe, 1884)

Eupterotidae
Stenoglene bipartita (Rothschild, 1917)

Geometridae
Acanthovalva inconspicuaria (Hübner, 1796)
Acidaliastis micra Hampson, 1896
Chiasmia feraliata (Guenée, 1858)
Chiasmia sudanata (Warren & Rothschild, 1905)
Euproutia aggravaria (Guenée, 1858)
Hemidromodes robusta (Prout, 1913)
Idaea fylloidaria (Swinhoe, 1904)
Isturgia disputaria (Guenée, 1858)
Isturgia quadriplaga (Rothschild, 1921)
Lomographa indularia (Guenée, 1858)
Lophorrhachia palliata (Warren, 1898)
Microloxia ruficornis Warren, 1897
Mixocera albistrigata (Pagenstecher, 1893)
Neostega flaviguttata Warren, 1903
Pitthea trifasciata Dewitz, 1881
Pseudosterrha rufistrigata (Hampson, 1896)
Rhodesia alboviridata (Saalmüller, 1880)
Scopula nepheloperas (Prout, 1916)
Zamarada minimaria Swinhoe, 1895
Zamarada nasuta Warren, 1897
Zamarada secutaria (Guenée, 1858)
Zamarada torrida D. S. Fletcher, 1974

Lasiocampidae
Beralade bistrigata Strand, 1909
Braura concolor (Rothschild, 1921)
Euwallengrenia reducta (Walker, 1855)
Pachymeta immunda (Holland, 1893)
Pallastica sanricia Zolotuhin & Gurkovich, 2009
Sena virgo (Oberthür, 1916)

Limacodidae
Micraphe lateritia Karsch, 1896

Lymantriidae
Casama griseola Rothschild, 1921
Casama innotata (Walker, 1855)
Euproctillina mesomelaena (Holland, 1893)
Euproctis rivularis Gaede, 1916
Knappetra fasciata (Walker, 1855)
Laelaroa flavimargo Hering, 1926
Liparodonta uniformis Hering, 1927
Marbla paradoxa (Hering, 1926)

Metarbelidae
Paralebedella schultzei (Aurivillius, 1905)
Salagena nigropuncta Le Cerf, 1919

Noctuidae
Acantholipes circumdata (Walker, 1858)
Achaea catella Guenée, 1852
Acontia asbenensis (Rothschild, 1921)
Acontia basifera Walker, 1857
Acontia buchanani (Rothschild, 1921)
Acontia citrelinea Bethune-Baker, 1911
Acontia gratiosa Wallengren, 1856
Acontia imitatrix Wallengren, 1856
Acontia karachiensis Swinhoe, 1889
Acontia semialba Hampson, 1910
Acontia sublactea Hacker, Legrain & Fibiger, 2008
Acontia trimaculata Aurivillius, 1879
Adisura affinis Rothschild, 1921
Adisura callima Bethune-Baker, 1911
Aegocera brevivitta Hampson, 1901
Aegocera rectilinea Boisduval, 1836
Agoma trimenii (Felder, 1874)
Agrotis biconica Kollar, 1844
Agrotis segetum ([Denis & Schiffermüller], 1775)
Anarta trifolii (Hufnagel, 1766)
Ariathisa abyssinia (Guenée, 1852)
Asplenia melanodonta (Hampson, 1896)
Cerocala caelata Karsch, 1896
Chrysodeixis chalcites (Esper, 1789)
Crypsotidia maculifera (Staudinger, 1898)
Crypsotidia mesosema Hampson, 1913
Crypsotidia remanei Wiltshire, 1977
Cyligramma latona (Cramer, 1775)
Dysgonia torrida (Guenée, 1852)
Eublemma bipars Gaede, 1935
Eublemma cochylioides (Guenée, 1852)
Eublemma deserti (Rothschild, 1909)
Eublemma dissoluta Rothschild, 1921
Eublemma parva (Hübner, [1808])
Eublemma perkeo Rothschild, 1921
Eulocastra aethiops (Distant, 1898)
Eulocastra pseudozarboides Rothschild, 1921
Eulocastra sahariensis Rothschild, 1921
Gnamptonyx innexa (Walker, 1858)
Grammodes buchanani Rothschild, 1921
Grammodes stolida (Fabricius, 1775)
Helicoverpa armigera (Hübner, [1808])
Helicoverpa zea (Boddie, 1850)
Heliocheilus confertissima (Walker, 1865)
Heliothis flavigera (Hampson, 1907)
Heliothis nubigera Herrich-Schäffer, 1851
Heliothis peltigera ([Denis & Schiffermüller], 1775)
Heteropalpia acrosticta (Püngeler, 1904)
Hypena obacerralis Walker, [1859]
Masalia albiseriata (Druce, 1903)
Masalia decorata (Moore, 1881)
Masalia nubila (Hampson, 1903)
Masalia terracottoides (Rothschild, 1921)
Melanephia nigrescens (Wallengren, 1856)
Melanephia trista (Snellen, 1872)
Mitrophrys magna (Walker, 1854)
Mitrophrys menete (Cramer, 1775)
Mocis frugalis (Fabricius, 1775)
Mocis proverai Zilli, 2000
Ozarba damagarima Rothschild, 1921
Ozarba punctigera Walker, 1865
Ozarba rubrivena Hampson, 1910
Pandesma robusta (Walker, 1858)
Plecopterodes moderata (Wallengren, 1860)
Polydesma umbricola Boisduval, 1833
Pseudozarba abbreviata Rothschild, 1921
Pseudozarba bella Rothschild, 1921
Pseudozarba bipartita (Herrich-Schäffer, 1950)
Pseudozarba opella (Swinhoe, 1885)
Rhynchina buchanani Rothschild, 1921
Rhynchina sahariensis Rothschild, 1921
Spodoptera cilium Guenée, 1852
Spodoptera exempta (Walker, 1857)
Spodoptera exigua (Hübner, 1808)
Spodoptera mauritia (Boisduval, 1833)
Tathorhynchus exsiccata (Lederer, 1855)
Trichoplusia ni (Hübner, [1803])

Notodontidae
Desmeocraera latex (Druce, 1901)
Scrancia leucopera Hampson, 1910

Pantheidae
Raphia buchanani Rothschild, 1921

Pyralidae
Abrephia gracilis (Rothschild, 1921)
Abrephia inconspicua (Rothschild, 1921)
Aglossa pinguinalis (Linnaeus, 1758)
Ancylosis cretaceogrisea (Rothschild, 1921)
Ancylosis faustinella (Zeller, 1867)
Ancylosis limoniella (Chrétien, 1911)
Ancylosis medioalba (Rothschild, 1921)
Bostra asbenicola Rothschild, 1921
Crocalia africana Rothschild, 1921
Crocidomera intensifasciata Rothschild, 1921
Epicrocis sahariensis (Rothschild, 1921)
Homoeosoma asbenicola Rothschild, 1921
Homoeosoma basalis Rothschild, 1921
Homoeosoma botydella Ragonot, 1888
Homoeosoma straminea Rothschild, 1921
Macalla soudanensis (Rothschild, 1921)
Mussidia nigrivenella Ragonot, 1888
Nephopterix dubiosa (Rothschild, 1921)
Pempelia interniplagella (Ragonot, 1888)
Pogononeura buchanani Rothschild, 1921
Pterothrixidia damergouensis (Rothschild, 1921)
Tephris buchanani (Rothschild, 1921)
Trachypteryx eximia (Rothschild, 1921)
Tyndis umbrosus Rothschild, 1921

Saturniidae
Bunaeopsis hersilia (Westwood, 1849)
Epiphora bauhiniae (Guérin-Méneville, 1832)
Holocerina angulata (Aurivillius, 1893)
Lobobunaea phaedusa (Drury, 1782)
Pseudantheraea discrepans (Butler, 1878)

Sphingidae
Neopolyptychus spurrelli (Rothschild & Jordan, 1912)

Tineidae
Hapsifera niphoxantha Gozmány, 1965

Tortricidae
Eccopsis wahlbergiana Zeller, 1852

Zygaenidae
Saliunca mimetica Jordan, 1907
Saliunca nkolentangensis Strand, 1913

References

External links 

Niger
Moths
Niger
Niger